The 1982–83 Utah Jazz season was the team's ninth in the NBA. They began the season hoping to improve upon their 25–57 output from the previous season. They bested it by five wins, finishing 30–52, but failed to qualify for the playoffs for the ninth straight season.

The Jazz drafted Dominique Wilkins with the 3rd overall pick in the 1982 NBA Draft, but was traded to the Atlanta Hawks after refusing to play for the Jazz. Wilkins would go on to have a Hall of Fame career.

Draft picks

Roster

Regular season

Season standings

z - clinched division title
y - clinched division title
x - clinched playoff spot

Record vs. opponents

Game log

Player statistics

Awards and records

Transactions

References

Utah Jazz seasons
U
Utah Jazz
Utah Jazz